Calvin "Cave" Carson is a fictional character that appeared in stories published by DC Comics. Carson, a spelunker, first appeared in Brave and the Bold #31 (September 1960); he was created by France Herron and Bruno Premiani.

Publication history
The Challengers of the Unknown were a quartet of science fiction adventurers created by Jack Kirby. They debuted in 1957, and their commercial success spawned two other science fiction characters: Cave Carson and Rip Hunter. Hunter was the more successful of the two. Unlike similar groups, namely Rip Hunter's Time Masters and the Sea Devils, Carson and his team never got their own title.

The group appeared in Brave and Bold #31–33, 40, and 41. Next they appeared in Showcase #48, 49, and 52. Carson's stories featured Carson and a team of fellow adventurers engaging in various adventures beneath the Earth's surface. He was joined by Bulldozer Smith, Johnny Blake, and Christie Madison.

Cave Carson would later appear as part of the Forgotten Heroes in the 1980s. He and his team helps repel the Apellaxian invasion. They help the Sea Devils and Aquaman by finding an underwater grotto. The others trapped a group of water-polluting "mercury" aliens inside the grotto.

Carson appeared as an ally to the Time Masters in the mini series of the same name in 1990.

By himself, he helps in the fight against Eclipso in the pages of Eclipso's own series. An ally of Amanda Waller, he leads Mona Bennet and Bruce Gordon through underground passages into the fictional country of Parador, which Eclipso had conquered. For his troubles, the villain breaks both his legs and leaves him on the border.

Cave and his team helps the Justice Society of America in retrieving Sand from deep within the Earth's crust. Cave Carson was mentioned in Infinite Crisis #5 on the news radio about an earthquake in India and in Japan in 2005. Later, during the Final Crisis event, he was featured briefly in a news report with his cave crew under the New York City Subway system, finding a way to explore the top of the world. As part of this excursion, they find ancient cave drawings under Manhattan.

Young Animal
The character was relaunched and reinvented in 2016 for DC's new publishing line Young Animal. The series, Cave Carson Has A Cybernetic Eye, is co-written by Gerard Way and Jon Rivera, with art by Michael Avon Oeming. As of March 2018, the series title was changed to Cave Carson Has An Interstellar Eye. It also began again from issue one.

Fictional character biography
Professor Calvin "Cave" Carson is an expert Geologist and skilled cave diver and spelunker. He worked with his friends Bulldozer Smith, Johnny Blake, and Christie Madison. Carson and a team of fellow adventurers engage in various adventures beneath the Earth's surface. Carson had a lifelong fascination with tunnels and caves, but maybe not always of high moral values as when he was young he started his career as a lab-tech for the company E. Borsten & Sons.

There he started the Mighty Mole Project, who were working on developing remarkable digging machine to help in mining-access. However the government's priority was on space shuttle and satellite projects, the funding of the Mighty Mole Project got cut.

Cave would later join the Forgotten Heroes, who help stop the Appellaxian invasion. They help Aquaman and the Sea Devils find an underwater grotto. The others trapped a group of water-polluting "Mercury" aliens inside the grotto. Cave later works with the Time Masters on one of their adventures in time.

Cave later battles Eclipso when working with government liaison Amanda Waller. He leads Mona Bennett and Bruce Gordon through underground passages of the nation of Parador, which Eclipso had conquered. Eclipso breaks both his legs and leaves him for dead on the border.

Cave also worked with the Justice Society of America in retrieving Sand from deep within the Earth's crust. He was mentioned on the news radio about an earthquake in India and in Japan. Cave was later mentioned in a news report with his crew under the New York subway system, finding a way to explore the top of the world.

References
 Greenberger, Robert (2008). "Carson, Cave". In Dougall, Alastair. The DC Comics Encyclopedia. New York: Dorling Kindersley. p. 73. . OCLC 213309017.
^ Jacobs, Will; Gerard Jones (1985). The Comic Book Heroes: From the Silver Age to the Present. New York, New York: Crown Publishing Group. pp. 38–39. .
^ "JLA Year One" #12 (December 1998)
^ "Eclipso" #5 (March 1993)
^ "JSA" #63–64 (2004)
^ "Final Crisis" #3.
^ "Cave Carson Has A Cybernetic Eye" 1 (October 2016)

External links
Toonopedia entry on Cave Carson
DCU Guide: Cave Carson
DCU Guide: Cave Carson chronology

DC Comics fantasy characters
Comics characters introduced in 1960
Characters created by France Herron